The Lompobattang fruit-dove (Ptilinopus meridionalis) is a species of bird in the pigeon family. It is native to Sulawesi, Indonesia.

Description 
These birds are around 35-37 cm long. They have black upperparts and a grey head and underparts. They have a dark-purple mask behind their eyes, which is unique for this species.

Taxonomy 
It was first described in 1893 by Meyer and Wiglesworth. This species was formerly placed with Ptilinopus fischeri before they were split into two distinct species.

Distribution 
This species occurs in south-western Sulawesi, Indonesia where they occupy an estimated surface of 468km2. They usually reside in forests and are found at elevations between 1,000 - 3,000m.

Status 
It is listed as vulnerable by the IUCN. There are believed to be between 2,500 and 10,000 Lompobattang fruit-doves in one sub-population.

Threats 
Habitat loss from deforestation has led to a slow decline in the population of the species.

Conservation 
While there are no current conversation actions in progress, there is a proposal for 200km2 of the Gunung Lompobattang mountain to be designated as a nature reserve.

See also 
 Fauna of Indonesia
 List of vulnerable birds
 Bantaeng Regency

References

Further reading 
 del Hoyo, J., Elliott, A., Sargatal, J. 1997. Handbook of the Birds of the World, vol. 4: Sandgrouse to Cuckoos. Lynx Edicions, Barcelona, Spain.
 Sibley, C.G. and Monroe, B.L. 1990. Distribution and Taxonomy of Birds of the World. Yale University Press, New Haven, USA.
 Sibley, C.G. and Monroe, B.L. 1993. A supplement to 'Distribution and Taxonomy of Birds of the World'. Yale University Press, New Haven, USA.

Vulnerable biota of Asia
Ptilinopus
Endemic birds of Sulawesi
Birds described in 1893
IUCN Red List vulnerable species